is a railway station on the Kōnan Railway Kōnan Line in Hirakawa, Aomori, Japan, operated by the private railway operator Konan Railway.

Lines

Station layout
The station has a one side platform serving a single bidirectional line. It is unattended, and has no station building other than a small shelter on the platform.

Adjacent stations

History
Onoekōkōmae Station opened on April 1, 1999, primarily to serve the local prefectural high school.

Passenger statistics
In fiscal 2011, the station was used by an average of 151 passengers daily.

Surrounding area
 , after which the station takes its name

See also
 List of railway stations in Japan

References

External links

 

Railway stations in Aomori Prefecture
Konan Railway
Hirakawa, Aomori
Railway stations in Japan opened in 1999